Tamás Szalai (born 12 June 1984) is a Hungarian football player who currently plays for Tatabánya in the NBII.

Honours
 Ferencvárosi TC
 Nemzeti Bajnokság I: 1
 Magyar Kupa: 1
 Szuperkupa: 1
 Canoe sprint at the 2015 European Games – Men's K-2 1000 metres  Gold medal

References

1984 births
Living people
Hungarian footballers
Ferencvárosi TC footballers
Association football forwards